The 2015–16 season was Real Madrid's 85th in existence and their 33rd consecutive season in the top flight of Spanish basketball. The club was involved in five competitions, having completed the Triple Crown last season.

Players

Squad information

Depth chart

Players in

|}

Total spending:  €0

Players out

|}
Total income:  €0

Total expenditure: €0

Club

Technical staff

Kit
Supplier: Adidas / Sponsor: Teka

Pre-season and friendlies

Competitions

Overall

Overview

Intercontinental Cup

Supercopa de España

Liga ACB

League table

Results summary

Results by round

Matches

Results overview

ACB Playoffs

Quarterfinals

Semifinals

Finals

Euroleague

Regular season

Top 16

Playoffs

Copa del Rey

Statistics

Liga ACB

ACB Playoffs

Copa del Rey

Supercopa de España

Euroleague

Intercontinental Cup

References

External links
 Official website
 Real Madrid at ACB.com 
 Real Madrid at Euroleague.net

Real Madrid
 
Real